Slatington is a borough in Lehigh County, Pennsylvania. As of the 2010 census, it had a population of 4,232. Slatington is located northwest of Allentown and Bethlehem. Slatington is part of the Lehigh Valley metropolitan area, which had a population of 861,899 and was thus the 68th most populous metropolitan area in the U.S. as of the 2020 census.

History

In 1737, Nicholas Kern was the first white settler in what would become Slatington. The Lenape Native Americans were already living along "Warriors Path," which would become Route 873. Kern established a sawmill shortly after arriving. In 1756, Benjamin Franklin reported to Governor Morris that he had procured boards and timber from Kern's sawmill. In the 19th century two Welshmen, who recognized its properties and importance from being used in Europe, discovered slate. A quarry was set up in 1845, and, in 1847, a factory was erected. In 1864, Slatington was incorporated into a Borough of Pennsylvania; its first Mayor was Robert McDowell. Historically, structural iron, knit goods, and silk were manufactured in Slatington, and there were abundant slate quarries in the area.

In 1900, 3,773 people lived in Slatington, and, by 1910, that number had grown to 4,454. Between 1910 and the 2010 census, the population reduced slightly, to 4,232.  The U.S. postal code (ZIP code) for Slatington, PA is 18080. Slatington was settled in 1738 and incorporated in 1864. 

In 2010, the Fireman's Drinking Fountain and Slatington Historic District were named to the National Register of Historic Places.

Geography
Slatington is located in northern Lehigh County at  (40.752561, −75.609229), on the west side of the Lehigh River. It is bordered to the east, across the river, by the borough of Walnutport in Northampton County.

Slatington is home to Victory Park, the location of the community pool, a disc golf course, and the Angelo J. Scarselletti Amphitheater.

Demographics

As of the census of 2010, there were 4,232 people, 1,743 households, and 1,190 families residing in the borough. The population density was 3,354.6 people per square mile (1,297.0/km²). There were 1,867 housing units at an average density of 1,412.5 per square mile (546.1/km²). The racial makeup of the borough was 96.23% White, 1.42% African American, 0.20% Native American, 0.38% Asian, 0.02% Pacific Islander, 0.77% from other races, and 0.97% from two or more races. Hispanic or Latino of any race were 2.03% of the population.

There were 1,743 households, out of which 35.7% had children under the age of 18 living with them, 48.7% were married couples living together, 13.9% had a female householder with no husband present, and 31.7% were non-families. 26.4% of all households were made up of individuals, and 12.5% had someone living alone who was 65 years of age or older. The average household size was 2.51 and the average family size was 3.01.

In the borough, the population was spread out, with 27.1% under the age of 18, 7.5% from 18 to 24, 32.4% from 25 to 44, 19.7% from 45 to 64, and 13.3% who were 65 years of age or older. The median age was 36 years. For every 100 females there were 94.7 males. For every 100 females age 18 and over, there were 89.3 males. The median income for a household in the borough was $36,531, and the median income for a family was $43,542. Males had a median income of $32,101 versus $23,796 for females. The per capita income for the borough was $16,189. About 10.6% of families and 12.3% of the population were below the poverty line, including 14.1% of those under age 18 and 10.1% of those age 65 or over.

Politics
Slatington is governed by a Borough Council consisting of 16 council members. The most recent council's term began on January 1, 2022, and will expire on December 31, 2023. These current council composition are as follows: Council President Thomas Bartholomew, Council Vice President Bryon Reed, Council President Pro Tempore Ronald Kratz, Council Member Joseph Wechsler, Council Member Kevin Steckel, Council Member Jeffrey Hausman, Council Member Zachari Halkias, Mayor Jeralyn Schoch, Borough Manager, Treasurer and Secretary Daniel Stevens, Assistant Secretary/Treasurer Colleen Bresnak, Utility Clerk/Payroll Linda Christman, P/T Clerk Elizabeth Miller, Borough Solicitor Edmund J. Healy, Borough Auditor is the Campbell, Rappold & Yurasits Firm, Zoning Officer Duane Dellecker and Ord. Enforcment Tony Lopsonzski.

Education
The borough is served by the Northern Lehigh School District. Northern Lehigh School District has two elementary schools.  Peters Elementary school educates students grades Kindergarten through second grade while Slatington Elementary educates grades 3–6. The district has only one middle school (grades 7–8) and Northern Lehigh High School in Slatington for grades nine through 12.

Transportation

Pennsylvania Route 873 is the only numbered highway traversing Slatington. It follows a north-south alignment through the borough via Main Street and Walnut Street.

Notable people
Anne Burlak, former organized labor leader
George Hennessey, former professional baseball player, Chicago Cubs and Philadelphia Phillies
Thomas R. Morgan, former U.S. Marine Corps Assistant Commandant
Ted Wieand, former professional baseball player, Cincinnati Reds

References

External links

 

1864 establishments in Pennsylvania
Boroughs in Lehigh County, Pennsylvania
Boroughs in Pennsylvania
Populated places established in 1737